The Cowardin classification system is a system for classifying wetlands, devised by Lewis M. Cowardin et al. in 1979 for the United States Fish and Wildlife Service.  The system includes five main types of wetlands:
 Marine wetlands- which are areas exposed to the open ocean
 Estuarine wetlands- partially enclosed by land and also exposed to a mixture of fresh and salt water bodies of water
 Riverine wetlands- associated with flowing water
 Lacustrine wetlands- associated with a lake or other body of fresh water
 Palustrine wetlands- freshwater wetlands not associated with a river or lake.
The primary purpose of this ecological classification system was to establish consistent terms and definitions used in inventory of wetlands and to provide standard measurements for mapping these lands.

See also
 Wetland conservation
 Wetlands of the United States

References
 

Notes

 
Habitats